Elizabeth Tilney, Countess of Surrey (before 1445 – 4 April 1497) was an English heiress who became the first wife of Thomas Howard, 2nd Duke of Norfolk (when still Earl of Surrey). She served successively as a lady-in-waiting to two Queen consorts, namely Elizabeth Woodville, wife of  King Edward IV, and later as Lady of the Bedchamber to that Queen's daughter, Elizabeth of York, the wife of King Henry VII. She stood as joint godmother to Princess Margaret Tudor at her baptism.

Her eldest son was Thomas Howard, 3rd Duke of Norfolk. Through two of her other children she was a grandmother of two queens consort of King Henry VIII, namely through her daughter Elizabeth Boleyn, Countess of Wiltshire she was the maternal grandmother of Queen Anne Boleyn and through a younger son, Lord Edmund Howard, she was the paternal grandmother of Queen Catherine Howard. Thus Elizabeth's great-grand-daughter was Queen Elizabeth I, the daughter of Anne Boleyn.

Elizabeth is commemorated as the "Countess of Surrey" in John Skelton's poem, The Garlande of Laurell, written following his visit to the Howard residence of Sheriff Hutton Castle.

Family
 
 
Elizabeth Tilney was born at Ashwellthorpe Hall sometime before 1445, the only child of Sir Frederick Tilney, of Ashwellthorpe, Norfolk, and Boston, Lincolnshire, and Elizabeth Cheney (1422–1473) of Fen Ditton, Cambridgeshire. Sir Frederick Tilney died before 1447, and before 1449 Elizabeth's mother married as her second husband Sir John Say of Broxbourne, Hertfordshire, Speaker of the House of Commons, by whom she had three sons, Sir William, Sir Thomas and Leonard, and four daughters, Anne (wife of Sir Henry Wentworth of Nettlestead, Suffolk), Elizabeth (wife of Thomas Sampson), Katherine (wife of Thomas Bassingbourne), and Mary (wife of Sir Philip Calthorpe). A fifth daughter died as a young child. Henry VIII's third queen consort, Jane Seymour, was the granddaughter of Henry Wentworth and Anne Say, and thus a second cousin to Henry VIII's second and fifth queens consort, Anne Boleyn and Katherine Howard.

Elizabeth's paternal grandparents were Sir Philip Tilney and Isabel Thorpe, and her maternal grandparents were Sir Laurence Cheney of Fen Ditton and Elizabeth Cockayne, widow of Sir Philip Butler. Elizabeth Cockayne was the daughter of Sir John Cockayne, Chief Baron of the Exchequer and Ida de Grey. Ida was a daughter of Welsh Marcher Lord Reginald Grey, 2nd Baron Grey de Ruthyn and Eleanor Le Strange of Blackmere. Through her mother, Ida was a direct descendant of Welsh Prince Gruffydd II ap Madog, Lord of Dinas Bran and his wife Emma de Audley.

Elizabeth was co-heiress to the manors of Fisherwick and Shelfield in Walsall, Staffordshire by right of her descent from Roger Hillary, Chief Justice of the Common Pleas (d. 1356).

Marriages
Elizabeth married her first husband, Sir Humphrey Bourchier, the son and heir of John Bourchier, 1st Baron Berners, and his wife, Margery, in about 1466. The marriage produced a son, John Bourchier, 2nd Baron Berners and two daughters. Following her marriage, Elizabeth went to court where she served as lady-in-waiting to Queen consort Elizabeth Woodville, whose train she had carried at the latter's coronation in May 1465 at Westminster Abbey. Elizabeth accompanied the queen and her children into sanctuary at Westminster Abbey when King Edward IV had been ousted from the throne, and was present at the birth of the future King Edward V. She remained with the queen until Edward IV was restored to power.

Sir Humphrey was killed at the Battle of Barnet on 14 April 1471 fighting on the Yorkist side. On 30 April 1472 Elizabeth married Thomas Howard, future Earl of Surrey, a marriage arranged by the King. In 1475, Elizabeth inherited her father's property of Ashwellthorpe Manor. 

Her second husband was a close friend and companion of Richard, Duke of Gloucester who was crowned king in 1483. Elizabeth was one of Anne Neville's attendants at Richard's coronation, while her husband bore the Sword of State. On 22 August 1485 Thomas's father John Howard, 1st Duke of Norfolk was killed at the Battle of Bosworth while fighting for Richard III; like his son, John was also one of King Richard's dearest friends. Thomas Howard was wounded at Bosworth and imprisoned in the Tower for several years, and the dukedom of Norfolk was forfeited. Elizabeth was fortunate that Thomas' attainder stipulated that she would not lose her own inheritance. On 3 October 1485, she wrote to John Paston, who was married to her cousin. The letter, which she had written from the Isle of Sheppey, mentioned how she had wished to send her children to Thorpe, pointing out that Paston had pledged to send her horses as a means of transporting them there. She continued to complain that Lord FitzWalter, an adherent of the new king Henry VII, had dismissed all of her servants; however, because of the stipulations in her husband's attainder, FitzWalter was unable to appropriate her manor of Askwell. 

In December 1485, she was living in London, near St Katharine's by the Tower, which placed her in the vicinity of her incarcerated husband.

After Thomas was released from prison and his earldom and estates were restored to him, he entered the service of Henry VII. In November 1487, Thomas and Elizabeth attended the coronation of Henry's consort Elizabeth of York, who appointed Elizabeth a Lady of the Bedchamber. Elizabeth was further honoured by being asked to stand as joint godmother to the Princess Margaret Tudor at her baptism in late 1489.

Her second marriage produced eleven children, including Thomas Howard, 3rd Duke of Norfolk, Elizabeth Howard, mother of Anne Boleyn, and Lord Edmund Howard, father of Katherine Howard.

Death and legacy
Elizabeth Tilney died on 4 April 1497 and it is commonly stated that she was buried in the nun's choir of the Convent of the Minoresses outside Aldgate. In her will, she left money to be distributed to the poor of Whitechapel and Hackney. 
However, historian Marilyn Roberts presents solid evidence why this will cannot be of Elizabeth Tilney. The will is written 9 years after Elizabeth Tilney died and refers to Elizabeth, Duchess of Norfolk. But Elizabeth Tilney would refer to herself as Countess of Surrey, not as Duchess of Norfolk because her husband wasn't duke of Norfolk when she died (he acquired the title many years later). 

Elizabeth Tilney is often confused with Elizabeth Talbot, last Mowbray Duchess of Norfolk, who definitely was buried in Aldgate. With Aldgate ruled out as a place of burial of Countess of Surrey, it is unknown where she was actually buried. Her family lived at the time of her death in Sheriff Hutton Castle near York, but she could have been buried somewhere else.

After her death, by licence dated 8 November 1497 Thomas Howard married as his second wife her cousin, Agnes Tilney, by whom he had seven more children.

Elizabeth's granddaughters included not only Katherine Howard and Anne Boleyn, but also three of Henry VIII's mistresses, Elizabeth Carew, Mary Boleyn and, allegedly, Mary Howard, Duchess of Richmond. During the reign of Henry VIII the Howards, led by Elizabeth's eldest son, Thomas Howard, 3rd Duke of Norfolk, became the premier family of England.

In poetry, art and fiction 
Elizabeth Tilney has been identified as the "Countess of Surrey" commemorated in John Skelton's The Garlande of Laurell, written by the poet laureate while he was a guest of the Howards in 1495 at Sheriff Hutton Castle. Three of Elizabeth's daughters, Anne, Elizabeth and Muriel are also addressed in the poem, which celebrates the occasion when Elizabeth, her daughters, and gentlewomen of her household placed a garland of laurel worked in silks, gold and pearls upon Skelton's head as a sign of homage to the poet.

Elizabeth's likeness is depicted in a stained glass window at Holy Trinity Church, Long Melford, Suffolk. She is shown facing Elizabeth Talbot, Duchess of Norfolk, and both figures are surmounted by the Mowbray family's coat of arms.

A highly romanticized fictional account of Elizabeth Tilney's life was written by Juliet Dymoke in The Sun in Splendour which depicts Elizabeth, known as "Bess", at the court of King Edward IV.

Issue
By Sir Humphrey Bourchier:
 John Bourchier, 2nd Baron Berners (1467–1533), married Katherine (d. 12 March 1536), the daughter of John Howard, 1st Duke of Norfolk, by whom he had a son, Thomas, and three daughters, Joan, Margaret and Mary; by a mistress allegedly named Elizabeth Bacon he had three illegitimate sons, Sir James, Humphrey and George, and one daughter, Ursula (wife of Sir William Sherington)
 Margaret Bourchier (1468–1552), Lady Governess to Princess Mary and Princess Elizabeth; married firstly, by agreement dated 11 November 1478, John Sandys, son and heir apparent of William Sandys of the Vyne, by whom she had no issue; secondly, Sir Thomas Bryan, by whom she had three children, including Sir Francis Bryan.
 Anne Bourchier (1470 – 29 September 1530), married Thomas Fiennes, 8th Baron Dacre, by whom she had three children.

By Thomas Howard, 2nd Duke of Norfolk:
Thomas Howard, 3rd Duke of Norfolk
Lord Edward Howard
Lord Edmund Howard, father of Henry VIII's fifth queen, Katherine Howard
Lord John Howard
Lord Henry Howard
Lord Charles Howard
Lord Henry Howard (the younger)
Lord Richard Howard
Lady Elizabeth Howard, married Thomas Boleyn, 1st Earl of Wiltshire, and was mother of Anne Boleyn, and grandmother of Elizabeth I
Lady Muriel Howard (d.1512), married firstly John Grey, 2nd Viscount Lisle (d.1504), and secondly Sir Thomas Knyvet
daughter (died young)

Family

Ancestry

Family tree

Footnotes

References

External links
Elizabeth Tylney in A Who's Who of Tudor Women
Dukes of Norfolk (Howard), Medieval Lands website by Charles Cawley

Women of the Tudor period
Elizabeth
Surrey, Elizabeth Tilney, Countess of
Elizabeth Tilney
English ladies-in-waiting
Ladies of the Bedchamber
People from Ashwellthorpe and Fundenhall
15th-century English people
15th-century English women
15th-century births
1497 deaths
Wives of knights